Paige Cothren (July 12, 1935 – September 1, 2016) was an American football placekicker. He played for the Los Angeles Rams from 1957 to 1958 and for the Philadelphia Eagles in 1959.

He died on September 1, 2016, in Tupelo, Mississippi at age 81.

References

1935 births
2016 deaths
American football placekickers
Ole Miss Rebels football players
Los Angeles Rams players
Philadelphia Eagles players